Peace to Us in Our Dreams is a 2015 Lithuanian drama film written, directed by and starring Šarūnas Bartas. It was screened in the Directors' Fortnight section at the 2015 Cannes Film Festival.

Cast
 Šarūnas Bartas
 Lora Kmieliauskaite
 Ina Marija Bartaité
 Edvinas Goldsteinas
 Giedrius Nakas

References

External links
 

2015 films
2015 drama films
Lithuanian-language films
Films directed by Šarūnas Bartas
Lithuanian drama films